Boris Belada (born 29 September 1920) was an Argentine sailor. He competed at the 1956 Summer Olympics and the 1968 Summer Olympics.

References

External links
 

1920 births
Possibly living people
Argentine male sailors (sport)
Olympic sailors of Argentina
Sailors at the 1956 Summer Olympics – Dragon
Sailors at the 1968 Summer Olympics – Dragon
Sportspeople from Prague